The Mondriaan Tower (Dutch: Mondriaantoren) is a skyscraper in Amsterdam, the Netherlands. It is the second tallest building in the city. The tower is located at the omval, an island in the Amstel river. The Mondriaantoren is 125 meters high and has 32 floors. It was opened in 2001, the tower is named for the old Dutch painter Piet Mondriaan.
The head office of Delta lloyd is based in the tower. It has a floor space of 32,000 m2.

Office buildings completed in 2001
Skyscraper office buildings in the Netherlands
Skyscrapers in Amsterdam
Amsterdam-Oost
Piet Mondrian